The Directorate-General for Climate Action (DG CLIMA), est. 2010, is a Directorate-General of the European Commission responsible for EU's international negotiations on climate, development and implementation of the EU Emissions Trading System  and production of the "European Green Deal" transformation plan. The 2022 Commissioner was Frans Timmermans (DG head Mauro Petriccione). 

The DG is closely related to the Directorate General for Environment and Directorate General for Energy.

References

See also
 European Commissioner for Climate Action

Climate Change
Environmental agencies in the European Union
Climate change ministries